Ceraceopsis is a fungal genus in the class Agaricomycetes. It has not yet been placed in any order or family. A monotypic genus, it contains the single corticioid species Ceraceopsis verruculosa, found growing on dead deciduous wood in Venezuela. The type collection was made in June 1997, in Yutajé (Amazonas State).
Ceraceopsis was circumscribed by mycologists Kurt Egon Hjortstam and Leif Ryvarden in 2007.

References

Agaricomycetes
Fungi of South America
Monotypic Basidiomycota genera
Taxa named by Leif Ryvarden